Jaime Zevallos is a Peruvian-American actor and writer. He is also of Spanish and German Jewish descent.

Early life

Jaime Zevallos was born in Peru. His family moved to New York when he was three.

Career
In 2018, Jaime Zevallos joined the cast of Marvel's Cloak & Dagger as Father Delgado, an ally to the titular characters.

In September 2020, Zevallos was cast along with Zachary Laoutides and Alexander James Rodriguez in the upcoming film "Where Sweet Dreams Die."

Personal life
He was named "one of the 25 most influential Latinos in Los Angeles" by Latino Leaders Magazine.

Filmography

References

External links
 

Living people
American people of Peruvian descent
Peruvian male actors
Peruvian writers
People from Lima
20th-century Peruvian writers
21st-century Peruvian writers
Year of birth missing (living people)